The greca, or more properly the douillette, is a clerical double-breasted overcoat worn over the cassock. The greca is slightly longer than the cassock so as to entirely cover it. 

The greca is black except in the case of the Pope who wears a white greca. The black greca may have either a plain or velvet collar.  The greca is usually worn in place of the manto, the clerical ankle-length cloak, with or without shoulder cape, worn over the cassock.

The greca, or douillette, came into the Catholic Church through France, was adapted from civil wear for the clergy in 1812, and has changed little since. 

The douillette came to be called a "greca", the Italian word for "Greek", as it reminded Roman clergy of the long black overcoat worn by Eastern priests.

Catholic clerical clothing